Aphanocarpus is a monospecific genus of flowering plants in the family Rubiaceae. It is placed in the tribe Psychotrieae.

It holds only one species, viz. Aphanocarpus steyermarkii, which is endemic to Venezuela.

References

External links 
 Aphanocarpus in the World Checklist of Rubiaceae

Monotypic Rubiaceae genera
Psychotrieae